Events in the year 2023 in Zambia

Incumbents

Events
Ongoing — COVID-19 pandemic in Zambia

 4 January – ZESCO, Zambia's largest power company, announces increased power cuts from six hours to twelve hours as a result of lower water levels at the Kariba Dam between Zambia and Zimbabwe.

Deaths
 7 January – Philemon Mulala, 59–60, Zambian footballer (Mufulira Wanderers, Cape Town Spurs, national team), injuries sustained from dog attack.

References

 
2020s in Zambia
Years of the 21st century in Zambia
Zambia
Zambia